African Blues is a world music benefit compilation album originally released in 1998, with proceeds going to Voluntary Service Overseas. Part of the World Music Network Rough Guides series, the release features African blues (a genre which is not simply an African re-interpretation of the American style, but carrying on traditions that were also exported to the Americas—see Origins of the blues). The compilation was produced and coordinated by Phil Stanton & Sandra Alayón-Stanton, co-founders of the World Music Network. Though they are named differently (the Rough Guide designation being omitted in this release and only found in the catalogue number, common practice for the label's charity releases), 2007's The Rough Guide to African Blues is sometimes considered this album's second edition.

Mali is represented in this album five times, Guinea twice, and Senegal, Zimbabwe, the DRC, Kenya, Mozambique, the ROC, and Cape Verde once each.

Critical reception

Writing for AllMusic, Adam Greenberg found relevance in the album for its "relatively early collection" of artists who would subsequently become the biggest African stars in the world music scene over the next decade. According to Greenberg, though not all tracks remained within the delineated genre, the music remained "worthwhile".

Track listing

References 

1998 compilation albums
World Music Network Rough Guide albums